Dunwich  is a village and civil parish in Suffolk, England.

In the Anglo-Saxon period, Dunwich was the capital of the Kingdom of the East Angles, but the harbour and most of the town have since disappeared due to coastal erosion. At its height it was an international port similar in size to 14th-century London. Its decline began in 1286 when a storm surge hit the East Anglian coast, followed by two great storms in February and December of 1287, until it eventually shrank to the village it is today. Dunwich is possibly connected with the lost Anglo-Saxon placename Dommoc.

The population of the civil parish at the 2001 census was 84, which increased to 183 according to the 2011 Census, though the area used by the Office of National Statistics for 2011 also includes part of the civil parish of Westleton. There is no parish council; instead there is a parish meeting.

History

Since the 15th century, Dunwich has frequently been identified with Dommoc – the original seat of the Anglo-Saxon bishops of the Kingdom of East Anglia established by Sigeberht of East Anglia for Saint Felix in c. 629–31. Dommoc was the seat of the bishops of Dommoc until around 870, when the East Anglian kingdom was taken over by the initially pagan Danes. Years later, antiquarians would even describe Dunwich as being the "former capital of East Anglia". However, many historians now prefer to locate Dommoc at Walton Castle, which was the site of a Saxon shore fort.

The Domesday Book of 1086 describes it as possessing three churches. At that time it had an estimated population of 3,000.

On 1 January 1286, a storm surge reached the east edge of the town and destroyed buildings in it. Before that, most recorded damage to Dunwich was loss of land and damage to the harbour.

This was followed by two further surges the next year, the South England flood of February 1287 and St. Lucia's flood in December. A fierce storm in 1328 also swept away the entire village of Newton, a few miles up the coast. Another large storm in 1347 swept some 400 houses into the sea. The Grote Mandrenke around 16 January 1362 finally destroyed much of the remainder of the town.

Most of the buildings that were present in the 13th century have disappeared, including all eight churches, and Dunwich is now a small coastal village. The remains of a 13th-century Franciscan priory (Greyfriars) and the Leper Hospital of St James can still be seen. A popular local legend says that, at certain tides, church bells can still be heard from beneath the waves.

Characterizing the fate of the town as the loss of "a busy port to ... 14th century storms that swept whole parishes into the sea" is inaccurate. It appears that the port developed as a sheltered harbour where the Dunwich River entered the North Sea. The town of Dunwich lost its raison d'etre and was largely abandoned. Sea defences were not maintained and coastal erosion progressively invaded the town.

As a legacy of its previous significance, the parliamentary constituency of Dunwich retained the right to send two members to Parliament until the Reform Act 1832 and was one of Britain's most notorious rotten boroughs.

By the mid-19th century, the population had dwindled to 237 inhabitants and Dunwich was described as a "decayed and disfranchised borough". A new church, St James, was built in 1832 after the abandonment of the last of the old churches, All Saints', which had been without a rector since 1755. All Saints' Church fell into the sea between 1904 and 1919, the last major portion of the tower succumbing on 12 November 1919. In 2005 historian Stuart Bacon stated that recent low tides had shown that shipbuilding had previously occurred in the town.

Marine archaeology

The Dunwich 2008 project funded by English Heritage and the Esmée Fairbairn Foundation was intended to collate all reliable historic mapped data on the same co-ordinate system and combine this with aerial photography and an underwater survey. New digital maps were produced by Prof. David Sear of Southampton University, marine archaeologist Stuart Bacon and the Geodata Institute. The survey also used multibeam and sidescan sonar to map the seafloor across the entire area of the town. These surveys identified a series of ruins that were confirmed by divers who recovered stones with lime mortar still attached. The lime mortar matched nearly perfectly with medieval mortar in existing churches on the coast. In 2009 Wessex Archaeology working with Professor Sear, captured the highest resolution sidescan images of the town site including the ruins found in 2008. Further work in 2010 with BBC Oceans and the BBC One Show used novel acoustic imaging cameras (dual-frequency identification sonar – DIDSON) to film the ruins through the turbid water. These clearly showed the jumble of ruined blocks and worked stone associated with medieval church and chapel sites. A large survey and updating of the mapped data was commissioned by English Heritage in 2011 and reported in 2012. This compiled all previous survey data and enhanced the historical map and coastal pilot charts for the site. The results have produced the most comprehensive survey of the Dunwich town site – the largest medieval underwater site in Europe.  Data from these surveys including maps and images explaining the different technologies are displayed in Dunwich Museum which is accredited by the Museum Archives Libraries Council. Details of Dunwich's 800-year battle to protect against coastal erosion are also displayed in the museum and it is hoped more work will be done in future. A database of references to Dunwich "designed to aid academic researchers, family historians and students" is available online.

In June 2011, at the invitation of Prof David Sear and the Dunwich Town Trust the Anglo-Saxon and medieval archaeology of Dunwich was the subject of an episode of archaeological television programme Time Team.

Further work to explore new sites using DIDSON and diver surveys and a campaign of land-based archaeology is scheduled for 2013–15 funded by the "Touching the Tide" Heritage Lottery Fund Landscape Partnership Scheme. This work hopes to confirm the date of the town ditches and roads and explore the record of environmental change in the marsh sediments. Altogether this work has identified the ruins of St Peter's and St Nicholas's churches, a chapel most probably St Katherine's, and ruins associated with Blackfriars friary and the town hall. The location of the Knight's Templar Church and All Saints' Church are known from the digital mapping but remain buried beneath an inner sandbank. As a result, it was found that Dunwich had been a substantial port in Saxon times.

Churches and other notable structures

Greyfriars: Franciscan priory in the southwest of the city. Being so far west it is one of the few significant parts of ancient Dunwich still visible. It was founded on a site nearer the sea in 1277, moved to its current position in 1290 and survived to the Dissolution of the Monasteries in 1538. The priory was originally enclosed by a stone wall, much of which remains. The most impressive structures still standing are part of the refectory and the 14th century gateway which would have been the main entrance to the monastic buildings.
St Bartholomew's and St Michael's were both chapels of ease that had been built by the end of the 11th century.
St Leonard's: was a parish church that fell to the sea in the 14th century.
St Nicholas's: was a cruciform building to the south of the city. Lost to the sea soon after the Black Death.
St Martin's: built before 1175, it was lost to the sea between 1335 and 1408.
St Francis Chapel: beside the Dunwich River, was lost in the 16th century.
St Katherine's Chapel: in the parish of St John, lost in the 16th century.
Preceptory of the Knights Templar: thought to have been founded around 1189 and was a circular building similar to the famous Temple Church in London. The sheriff of Suffolk and Norfolk reported in his accounts of 1309 that he found the sum of £111, 14 shillings and sixpence farthing (£111-14s-6¼d) contained in four pouches – a vast sum that had been deposited with the Templars for safe keeping by Robert of Seffeld, parson of Brampton. In 1322, on the orders of Edward II implementing the papal bull Ad providam, all the Templars' land passed to the Knights Hospitallers. Following the suppression of the Hospitallers during the Dissolution of the Monasteries under Henry VIII, in 1562 the Temple was demolished. The foundations washed away during the reign of Charles I.
St Peter's: similar in length to the church at nearby Blythburgh. It was stripped of anything of value as the cliff edge drew nearer. The east gable fell in 1688 and the rest of the building followed in 1697. The parish register survives and is now in the British Library.
Blackfriars: Dominican priory in the southeast of the city. It was founded during the time of Henry III by Roger Holish. By 1385 preparations were made for the Dominicans to move to nearby Blythburgh as the sea front drew nearer, although prematurely, as the priory remained active and above sea level until at least the Dissolution of the Monasteries under Henry VIII. The last building fell to the sea in 1717.

All Saints' Church: last of Dunwich's ancient churches to be lost to the sea. It was abandoned in the 1750s after it was decided the parishioners could no longer afford the upkeep, although burials occurred in the churchyard until the 1820s. The cliff edge reached All Saints' in 1904 and the tower (at its west end) fell in 1922. One of the tower buttresses was salvaged and now stands in the current Victorian-era St James' Church. One of the last remaining gravestones, in memory of John Brinkley Easey, fell over the cliff in the early 1990s. A large block of masonry could still be seen at the water's edge at low tide in 1971.

RAF Dunwich
During the Second World War, RAF Dunwich was one of the Chain Home Low stations which provided low-level radar cover for the central East Anglian coast.

Bicycle ride
The annual Dunwich Dynamo through-the-night bicycle ride ends on Dunwich beach.

In popular culture and literature

The novel Red Eve by H Rider Haggard has several scenes set in fourteenth century Dunwich.  The title character, Eve Clavering, is a member of a Dunwich family whose properties have been partly destroyed by the sea.

The poet Algernon Swinburne wrote By the North Sea following visits to Dunwich in 1875 and 1877.

In the novel "An Affair of Dishonour" by William De Morgan the Battle of Solebay is viewed from the shore by characters living at a manor house said to be remote "since the sea swallowed up the township of which it was a suburb".

Al Stewart's 1993 song "The Coldest Winter in Memory" includes the lines

The last track on Brian Eno's 1982 album Ambient 4: On Land is called "Dunwich Beach, Autumn, 1960." Eno was born in Woodbridge, Suffolk, about 23 miles from Dunwich.

British Progressive Rock band The Future Kings of England recorded a track called "Dunwich" for their 2007 album The Fate of Old Mother Orvis. The cover of the album features an old photo of Dunwich.

Norwegian science fiction and fantasy author Øyvind Myhre in 1991 published the novel Mørke over Dunwich (Darkness over Dunwich), set in the village. Myhre connects the name of the village to H. P. Lovecraft's story "The Dunwich Horror" (set in the US) and draws on the Cthulhu mythos, primarily the novella The Shadow over Innsmouth, for his own horror story.

In the "Laundry Files" series of books by Charles Stross the village of Dunwich is used as training facility for a secret occult agency. These books also draw from the Lovecraft mythos.

W.G. Sebald's 1995 novel The Rings of Saturn features a visit by the author to Dunwich in the course of his walking tour of Suffolk in 1992; it forms a primary basis for his meditation on time, memory and decay.

P.D. James's 1967 novel Unnatural Causes is partly set in Dunwich.

Mark Fisher and Justin Barton's essay On Vanishing Land references the sunken city, the surrounding area and the Eno album from where it takes its name.

Lovejoy episode 'The Last of the Uzkoks' opens with Lovejoy, supposedly in Dunwich, looking at some Charles Keen sketches of Dunwich on Sea, and indicating that it 'is under 30 ft of water'.

See also
Lost city
Covehithe
Easton Bavents
Rungholt and Ravenser Odd
Dunwich, Australia

References

Sources
 Durham, A., Corbett, S., Dunwich: A ghost story
Men of Dunwich, Rowland Parker (Alastair Press, 1978), 
Memories of Bygone Dunwich, Ernest Read Cooper (Southwold: F. Jenkins, 1948)

Further reading
Ancient Dunwich: Suffolk's Lost City, Jean Carter and Stuart Bacon. (Segment, 1975)
The Lost City of Dunwich, Nicholas Comfort (Terence Dalton, 1994), 
Men of Dunwich, Rowland Parker (Alastair Press, 1978), 
A Suffolk Coast Garland, Ernest Read Cooper (London: Heath Cranton Ltd, 1928).
Memories of Bygone Dunwich, Ernest Read Cooper (Southwold: F. Jenkins, 1948).
The little freemen of Dunwich, Ormonde Pickard
"By the North Sea" and Tristram of Lyonesse, Algernon Charles Swinburne, in Major Poems and Selected Prose, Jerome McGann and Charles L. Sligh, eds. (New Haven: Yale University Press, 2004) 189–202, 206–312.
Dunwich: A Tale of the Splendid City, James Bird, 1828.
''Bernard Cornwell, The Saxon Chronicles, Book 5 – The Burning Land

External links

Dunwich official website of the parish
Dunwich, UK (New Scientist article)
Reconstructed map of Dunwich town
Coastal change at Dunwich

 
Villages in Suffolk
Former populated places in Suffolk
Submerged places
Underwater ruins
Populated coastal places in Suffolk
Civil parishes in Suffolk
Coastal erosion in the United Kingdom
Beaches of Suffolk
English folklore
Culture in Suffolk
History of Suffolk